Iskander Hachicha (born March 21, 1972) is a former Tunisian judoka.

Achievements

References
 
 

1972 births
Living people
Tunisian male judoka
Judoka at the 1996 Summer Olympics
Judoka at the 2000 Summer Olympics
Olympic judoka of Tunisia
Mediterranean Games bronze medalists for Tunisia
Mediterranean Games medalists in judo
Competitors at the 1997 Mediterranean Games
African Games medalists in judo
African Games gold medalists for Tunisia
Competitors at the 1999 All-Africa Games
21st-century Tunisian people